Velagići  is a village in the municipality of Ključ, Bosnia and Herzegovina. As of 2013, the village had a population of 573.

Demographics 
According to the 2013 census, its population was 465.

References

Populated places in Ključ